BW or Bw may stand for:

Businesses and organizations
 Baldwin Wallace University, Berea, Ohio, US
 Bergesen Worldwide, a shipping company
 Best Western, a hotel company 
 British Waterways
 Brush Engineered Materials (NYSE stock symbol BW)
 Bundeswehr, the armed forces of Germany
 Former BWIA West Indies Airways (IATA Airline code BW)
 Caribbean Airlines (IATA airline code BW)

Places
 Baden-Württemberg, a federal state of Germany
 Botswana (ISO 2-letter country code)
.bw, Internet Top Level Domain, Botswana

In science and technology
 Bahnbetriebswerk, locomotive depot in German
 Bandwidth (disambiguation), abbreviation
 Bargmann–Wigner equations, in quantum field theory
 SAP Business Information Warehouse or SAP BW, software

Other uses
 b/w ("backed with"), on record singles
 Burgerlijk Wetboek, Netherlands civil code
 Rosemary Lyons, "Beautiful Wife" of Earl Wilson

See also
 BVV (disambiguation)
 B&W (disambiguation)